Ian Anderson Winters (8 February 1921 – 3 May 1994) was a Scottish footballer.

Winters played for New Earswick, York City, Boston United, Gateshead, Workington & Kettering Town.

Notes

1921 births
1994 deaths
Scottish footballers
Association football forwards
York City F.C. players
Boston United F.C. players
Gateshead F.C. players
Workington A.F.C. players
Kettering Town F.C. players
English Football League players